The 2003 World Junior Table Tennis Championships were held in Santiago, Chile, from 14 to 21 December 2003. It was organised by the Federación Chilena de Tenis de Mesa under the auspices and authority of the International Table Tennis Federation (ITTF).

Medal summary

Events

Medal table

See also

2003 World Table Tennis Championships

References

World Junior Table Tennis Championships
World Junior Table Tennis Championships
World Junior Table Tennis Championships
World Junior Table Tennis Championships
Table tennis competitions in Chile
International sports competitions hosted by Chile
World Junior Table Tennis Championships